Lorraine Garcia-Nakata (born 1950) is an American artist who works with various mediums including pastel, charcoal, ceramics, printmaking, installation, sculpture, and paint. Her work surrounds themes of the daily life, portraiture, and realism and is known for her large scale artworks. She is a member of the Royal Chicano Air Force (RCAF) artist collective since 1974.

Early life and education 
Garcia-Nakata was born in Yuba City, California as the third generation in her family to reside in the United States. Her maternal grandparents Basilio Prado and Juanita Montes Muños, came to the United States in 1914, during the Mexican Revolution. Lorraine grew up in the Central Valley and identifies as Chicana. Lorraine lived in Oroville, California before moving to Olivehurst, California.
Lorraine earned an Associates of Arts Degree from Yuba College, in Marysville, CA in 1973. She transferred to California State University, Sacramento as an Art major and graduated with honors in 1974. In 1976, Lorraine was accepted into the art department of the University of Washington, Seattle as a sculpture major and on the Dean's List. She was hired at the University, Henry Gallery, where she met (now deceased) Curator, Lamar Harrington initiating Lorraine's museum knowledge and expertise. During the period (1970-1979) she and her partner "lived-on-the-land" made home in Eastern Washington, she also did independent study, as an apprentice with now deceased master potter, Everett Lynch(1898-1988). Here, she also apprenticed in weaving (counter-balance loom) with Everett's spouse, Dorothy. Mr. Lynch approached Lorraine about carrying on his studio, however Lorraine would be making a move accepting a position teaching ceramics and drawing at Moses Lake College, Moses Lake, Washington. Art Department Chair, Stephen Tse wanted her to become Chair when he retired, however it was at this time Lorraine made a major decision by returning to California in August 1979. This began a new life chapter as the following biographical information shares.

Current affiliations 
Garcia-Nakata is currently part of the Chairman's Advisory Committee at the Friends of National Museum For the American Latino since 2017. She is a founding member of the San Francisco Latino Historical Society since 2015. In 1997 she became part of the International Advisory for the Diego Rivera Mural in San Francisco City College and in 1995 she was an Advisory Board member for the Kearny Street Art Workshop, also located in San Francisco.

Major artworks

Southside Park Mural, 1977 
The famous multi panel mural project in Sacramento, California was restored in 2001 by the RCAF group, including Garcia-Nakata who designed, outlined, and painted two Amerindian women with their hands open. These murals provide a culturally appropriate setting for community events such as Cinco de Mayo, Dia de Los Muertos, or the Barrio Olympics. Each panel has its own distinctive artistic style and make references to pre-Columbian, Neo-Amerindian, and Chicanx youth iconography.

Friends, No Matter What, 2008 
This artwork is done with charcoal and pastel on paper and was exhibited online at the Museo Eduardo Carrillo website. It represents the artist herself and her African American friend playing hide and seek, while standing back to back and blindfolded. It references the racial tension that has existed throughout American culture and personal experiences of the artists.

Facio Nova Omnia II: Colonia and Facio Nova Omnia II: Indigena, 2005 
This diptych consists of two unidentified women with their backs towards the viewers dressed in complete different attire. Colonia has a blue formal dress on completely faceless, while Indigena is slightly turned towards her left shoulder wearing her indigenous attire and long braided hair. Both of these women are assumed to come from different backgrounds and their juxtaposition makes it easier for viewers to distinguish this cultural gap between them.

Exhibitions

Solo exhibitions 

 2015-  Navigating By Hand: Lorraine García-Nakata Retrospective 1964-2015, September 5-October 16, 2015, Galeria de la Raza/Studio 24, San Francisco, CA
 2013/14-  Navigating By Hand: Lorraine García-Nakata, Museo Eduardo Carrillo, September 15, 2013 – February 2014, Santa Cruz, CA
 2008-  RCAF In Flight: Lorraine Garcia Nakata, solo exhibition, Galería Posada, Aug. 8 – Oct.19, Sacramento, CA
 1993-  So Do You Want the Truth, Intercultural Gallery, Sonoma State University, CA.
 1990-  The Red Shoes ( an Installation), Squiggle Performance and Installation Gallery, San Francisco, CA.Mar. 1 - 31
 1983-  Eye Dream Space, Sacramento, CA
 1981-  Progressive Gallery, Sonoma State University, CA
 1980-  Nicole's, Sacramento, CA
 1978-  California State University, Sacramento, CA
 1974-  Lorraine Garcia Exhibition, California State University, Sacramento, CA

Group exhibitions (past 10 years) 

 2013/14-  Navigating By Hand: Lorraine García-Nakata, Museo Eduardo Carrillo, September 15, 2013 – February 2014, Santa Cruz, CA
 2008-  RCAF In Flight: Lorraine Garcia Nakata, solo exhibition, Galería Posada, Aug. 8 – Oct.19, Sacramento, CA
 1993-  So Do You Want the Truth, Intercultural Gallery, Sonoma State University, CA.
 1990-  The Red Shoes ( an Installation), Squiggle Performance and Installation Gallery, San Francisco, CA.Mar. 1 - 31
 1983-  Eye Dream Space, Sacramento, CA
 1981-  Progressive Gallery, Sonoma State University, CA
 1980-  Nicole's, Sacramento, CA
 1978-  California State University, Sacramento, CA
 1974-  Lorraine Garcia Exhibition, California State University, Sacramento, CA
 2013-  If Gender Is A Kind of Doing, Lorraine García-Nakata, Regina José Galindo, Deborah Roberts, Rye Purvis, Laura Lucía Sanz, Ana Teresa Fernández, Elizabeth Maynard, Mission Cultural Center for Latino Arts, San Francisco. CA. Curated by Ella Díaz, English & Latino(a) Studies, Cornell University
 2011-  Forty Years in the Making, retrospective art from (1970-2010), January, Galeria de la Raza/Studio 24, SF, CA.
 2009-  What Is This Thing Called Love, February 11-March 22, 2009, Curated by Juan Carrillo, La Raza Galeria Posada, Sacramento, CA.

Exhibitions curated by Lorraine García-Nakata 

 2004-  Illuminations: Day of the Dead Indigenous and Colonial Expressions, Curated-Lorraine García-Nakata, October 13-December 5, 2004, Oakland Museum, Oakland, CA.
 1993-   La Fe: Spiritual & Religious Expressions in Chicano Art, Galeria de la Raza/Studio 24, S.F., CA, April 13 - May 15
 1992-  The Works of Eva Garcia, November–December 1992, Intersection For The Arts, San Francisco, CA
 1985-   Obelisk: Individual Points of Reference, Rara Avis Gallery, Sacramento, CA, April 15 - May 3.
 1980-   What We Are Now, touring exhibition, May - October 1980.

Publications 

Chola Enterprises, 2015 
Children’s Stories for Adults: from the I Can Eat Fire Writings, 2018 
Illuminations: Day of the Dead Indigenous and Colonial Expressions, 2004 
Mexican Museum/La Casa Futura, Lorraine García-Nakata, 1998

Awards 

 2016, Stanford University Library, Special Collections acquires Lorraine García-Nakata Papers, Stanford University, Stanford, CA. April 6
 2010, State of California Senate, Certificate of Recognition, Lorraine García-Nakata
 2010, San Francisco Mexican Consulate Honors Lorraine García-Nakata in conjunction with. Bicentennial of Independence and Centennial of the Mexican Revolution
 2009, San Francisco Community Leadership Awards, Children’s Book Press, Lorraine García-Nakata, Publisher/Executive Director
 2006, Artist Residency, Chicano Visions Exhibition Special Program, Royal Chicano Air Force (RCAF): Lorraine García-Nakata, Juanishi Orosco, Esteban Villa, José Montoya, September 2006, Kimball Gallery, San Francisco De Young Museum.
 2005, Certificate of Special Congressional Recognition, Member of Congress, Nancy Pelosi
 2003, California Arts Council, Visual Arts Fellowship Award, Printmaking
 2001, US Senate Certificate of Recognition
 1999, Profiles Of Excellence: Lorraine García-Nakata, Channel 7/KGO, San Francisco, CA
 1998, Salute, Bay Area Latinos, abc 7 KGO Television, August 12, San Francisco, CA (Award ceremony/on-air profile)
 1998, Honored Guests: Susan Leal, Treasurer, City County of SF and Lorraine García-Nakata, Director, The Mexican Museum, Green Room, Warm Memorial Building.
 1990, Ballad of the Bones (commissioned sculpture installation)Other artists involved in Ballad: Wong Aoki, Mark Izu, Michal Keck, John O'Neal, David Pangaro, Jael Weisman, Judith Kajiwara, Jill Whitcroft, Festival 2000, Cowell Theatre, Fort Mason Center, San Francisco, CA
 1985, Atelier IV, print commission,June-Ralph Maradiaga, Lorraine García, Eloy Torrez, Linda Vallejo, Willie Herron
 1979/80, Artist-in-Residence, California Arts Council

Bibliography 

Diaz, Ella Maria. “Flying Under the Radar with the Royal Chicano Air Force Mapping a Chicano/a Art History By Ella Maria Diaz.” The University of Texas Press, 15 Mar. 2019, utpress.utexas.edu/books/diaz-flying-under-the-radar-with-royal-chicano-air-force.
Keller, Gary D., and Amy K. Phillips. “Triumph of Our Communities.” Triumph of Our Communities | Bilingual Press, 22 June 2011, bilingualpress.clas.asu.edu/book/triumph-our-communities.
Murawski, Mike. “Telling to Live: Testimonio as Educational Praxis.” Art Museum Teaching, artmuseumteaching.com/tag/lorraine-garcia-nakata/.
Watson, Sheila. “Museums and Their Communities.” CRC Press, 7 Aug. 2007, www.crcpress.com/Museums-and-their-Communities/Watson/p/book/9780415402606.
Hablamos Juntos, Together We Speak Project, Curriculum/Contemporary Latina Broadside Project, Lorraine García-Nakata, Natural History, 2019
Artistas Chicanas, The Mexican Museum, Spring Issue, 1985, San Francisco, CA
Burgos-Debray. Verso, NY and London, 2009. (2nd Ed). The Latina Feminist Group. 2001. Telling to Live: Latina Feminist Testimonios. Duke University Press.

References

External links 
 

1950 births
Living people
American women painters
People from Yuba City, California
American muralists
Women muralists
21st-century American women